Captain J. W. Boateng was a Ghanaian naval personnel and served in the Ghana Navy. He served as Chief of Naval Staff of the Ghana Navy from January 1982 to March 1982.

References

Ghanaian military personnel
Ghana Navy personnel
Chiefs of Naval Staff (Ghana)